Stanley Mace Whittaker Jr. (born October 21, 1994) is an American professional basketball player for the s.Oliver Würzburg of Germany’s Basketball Bundesliga. He played college basketball for Keiser University Seahawks, where he was coached by Rollie Massimino.

College career
Stanley Whittaker attended Frank Phillips College from 2013 to 2015, before transferring to Keiser University in West Palm Beach, Florida. He graduated in 2017. At Keiser, he played under head coach Rollie Massimino who died in August 2017. Whittaker was a two-time NAIA All-American.

Club career
After his college education, Stanley Whittaker suffered several professional and personal setbacks. Whittaker couldn't find a job in basketball for two years. He kept in touch with his sport through training children.

In 2019 he had the first engagement with BC Jonava where he played a few games during the 2019–20 LKL season (Second Lithuanian league). 

Fortunately for Whittaker, in January 2020, several players from UBSC Graz were involved in a betting scandal so Graz needed replacement players at short notice. Although Whittaker barely had time to settle in Austria, he scored over 18 points per game in his first season and averaged eight assists. He even improved this record in the 2020–21 Austrian Basketball Superliga with an average of over 21 points and eight assists. Besides being the league's best scorer, he also served as team captain for UBSC Graz.

In August 2021, he signed with PS Karlsruhe Lions of the German ProA. He scored over 22 points, got over 5 rebounds and made over 6 assists per game in 34 games for the PS Karlsruhe Lions.

In June 2022, he signed with s.Oliver Würzburg of the German Basketball Bundesliga.

References

External links
Profile at Eurobasket.com
Profile at Karlsruhe Lions website
Profile at German ProA league website
Profile at scoutBasketball
Profile at RealGM
Profile at Proballers

1994 births
Living people
American expatriate basketball people in Austria
American expatriate basketball people in Germany
American expatriate basketball people in Lithuania
American men's basketball players
Basketball players from Philadelphia
Guards (basketball)
Keiser Seahawks
PS Karlsruhe Lions players
s.Oliver Würzburg players